Erondegemse Pijl (also known as Erpe-Mere) is an elite women's professional one-day road bicycle race held in Belgium and is currently rated by the UCI as a 1.2 race.

Past winners

References 

 
Cycle races in Belgium
Women's road bicycle races